The Marquette Golden Eagles men's basketball team (formerly the Marquette Hilltoppers and Marquette Warriors) represents Marquette University in NCAA Division I college basketball and competes in the Big East Conference. The team plays its home games at Fiserv Forum in downtown Milwaukee (also the home of the NBA's Milwaukee Bucks).

Marquette has made 35 NCAA tournament appearances, including 23 round of 32 appearances, 16 sweet sixteens, 7 elite eights, and 3 final fours. They were the national runner-up 1 time and have won 1 national championship. Both of Marquette's appearances in National Title games came prior to the introduction of the three point line and the shot clock. Marquette first joined a conference in 1989, winning 5 conference regular season championships and 2 conference tournament championships. Marquette has had 3 national coaches of the year, 4 conference coaches of the year, 1 national player of the year, 9 consensus all-americans, 4 conference players of the year, and 16 all-conference first team selections. Marquette has also had 3 Naismith Memorial Basketball Hall of Fame and 4 National Collegiate Basketball Hall of Fame inductees. Additionally, 39 Marquette players have gone on to play in the NBA combining for 7 NBA championships, 25 NBA all-star selections, and 11 all-NBA selections.

History

McGuire era
Al McGuire became the head coach in 1964 and brought the program to national prominence, earning an NIT Championship in 1970 and a Final Four appearance in 1974 against the North Carolina State Wolfpack, where McGuire became the first coach ejected from a championship  McGuire coached with assistants Hank Raymonds and Rick Majerus, who would each have their own stints as head of the program following his departure. In his final season as a collegiate head coach, McGuire led Marquette to its only NCAA basketball championship in 1977. Led by Alfred "Butch" Lee, Maurice "Bo" Ellis and Jerome Whitehead, the team beat UNC Charlotte in the national semifinals after Whitehead received a full-court pass and subsequently made a last-second shot. Two days later, Marquette defeated Dean Smith's North Carolina Tar Heels for the title. The team set a record with seven losses going into the NCAA tournament, the most losses up to that time for a team that would win the NCAA Championship.

Crean era
Tom Crean took over the program on March 30, 1999. According to Crean, "Once Marquette became available, that's where my sights were. I had unbelievable respect for the tradition and the name. When I thought of Marquette, I thought of a true basketball school and to me that had a lot to do with it." Crean immediately made a number of changes at Marquette, creating a new team image by increasing the significance of the team's media day and instituting a "Midnight Madness" event commonly held by schools on the night teams are allowed to begin practice. Crean's first recruiting class was considered by experts to be among the top twenty in the country, Marquette's first in a long time.

In his nine years with Marquette, Crean's teams earned five NCAA tournament bids, one more than the previous four Marquette coaches had in the 16 years prior to his arrival. During his tenure there Crean recruited, developed and coached a number of skilled players that made significant contributions in both the NCAA and NBA, including Dwyane Wade, Dominic James, Steve Novak, Wesley Matthews, and Travis Diener.

Over his final seven seasons at Marquette, Crean compiled an aggregate record of 160–68 (.702). The 2002–03 season was one of the best in Marquette history. The team made a Final Four appearance for the first time since winning the NCAA Championship in 1977. Crean has referred to the team's run as "one of the greatest four or five days of my life."

Later that year, Marquette accepted an offer to leave Conference USA for the Big East Conference after the 2004–2005 season. Big East commissioner Mike Tranghese cited his friendship with Crean as contributing to the invitation, saying, "That, to me, was one of the great appeals, to get Tommy as well as Marquette into the league."

When Crean was asked why he left Marquette, Crean replied, "It's Indiana.  It's Indiana, and that is the bottom line."

Williams era
After Crean departed for the head job at Indiana, Buzz Williams was hired as the new head coach for the 2008–09 season, leading Marquette to a 25–10 record in and a second round loss to the Missouri Tigers in the 2009 NCAA tournament. He coached Marquette to a 22–12 record in the 2009–10 season, which ended with a close loss to the 11th-seeded Washington Huskies in the First Round of the 2010 NCAA tournament.

During the 2010–11 campaign, Williams led the Golden Eagles back to the Sweet Sixteen for the first time since 2003. His team went 22–15 including a 9–9 Big East Conference record. They lost in the quarterfinals of the 2011 Big East men's basketball tournament to Louisville. Marquette received an at-large bid in the 2011 NCAA tournament.  There they defeated Xavier in the second round (formerly the First Round) and Syracuse in the Third Round to advance to the Sweet Sixteen. In the Sweet Sixteen, they were defeated by No. 7-ranked and No. 2-seeded North Carolina.   

Wiliams' 2012 team returned to the NCAA tournament after finishing second in the Big East regular season, finishing 14–4 in conference play. As a No. 3 seed in the NCAA tournament, they defeated BYU and Murray State to advance to their second straight Sweet Sixteen. There, they lost to No. 7-seeded Florida. 

After winning a share of the Big East Men's regular season championship, Marquette received an at-large bid in the 2013 NCAA tournament as a No. 3 seed. There, they earned come-from-behind victories over Davidson in the Second Round and Butler in the Third Round. In the Sweet Sixteen, the school's third straight under Williams, they defeated ACC regular season and conference champion Miami to earn a trip to Williams's first Elite Eight, where they lost to Syracuse. 

The 2013–14 season was Williams' worst at Marquette, finishing 17–15 with a loss to Xavier in the Big East tournament.

Wojciechowski era
On April 1, 2014, Steve Wojciechowski was hired as the new Marquette head basketball coach, replacing Buzz Williams, who left for Virginia Tech. 

Before the 2014-15 season, Marquette lost several players, including Jamil Wilson and Davante Gardner. The team struggled mightily, finishing 13-19 overall and 4-14 in conference play, tying for last in the conference standings. After beating Seton Hall in the first round of the Big East Tournament, Marquette lost to Villanova in the quarterfinals. Marquette failed to qualify for any postseason tournament.

The 2015-16 campaign was highlighted by Henry Ellenson, a five-star recruit from Rice Lake, Wisconsin. Ellenson won the 2016 Big East Rookie of the Year award, and was named first-team All-Big East in his lone season in the NCAA. Besides Ellenson, Luke Fischer and Haanif Cheatham also played significant roles. The Golden Eagles finished the year 20-13, with an 8-10 record in the Big East, placing 7th in the conference. Marquette's season would come to an end after losing to Xavier in the quarterfinals of the 2016 Big East Tournament.

After losing Ellenson to the NBA, Marquette reloaded with 3 four-star recruits joining the 2016-17 team, Markus Howard, Sam Hauser, and Brendan Bailey. Despite being picked to finish seventh in the Big East, Marquette finished the season tied for 3rd in the Big East, going 19–13 with a 10–8 record in the Big East. After losing to Seton Hall in the quarterfinals of the 2017 Big East Tournament, Marquette earned a 10 seed in the 2017 NCAA Tournament, their first appearance since 2013, but lost to eventual final four participants South Carolina.

After losing Luke Fischer, JaJuan Johnson, and Haanif Cheatham, Marquette added four-star recruits Jamal Cain and Ike Eke, and three-star recruits Theo John and Greg Elliott for the 2017-18 season. The team failed to match the success of the previous season, finishing 21-14 with a 9–9 record in the Big East, tying for 6th in the conference. The team was headlined by Markus Howard, Sam Hauser, and Andrew Rowsey, with the three combining for 55 PPG during the season. After beating DePaul in the first round of the 2018 Big East Tournament, Marquette lost to eventual NCAA champion Villanova in the quarterfinals. Marquette qualified as a 2 seed for the 2018 NIT, beating Harvard and Oregon before losing to 4 seed Penn State in the quarterfinals.

The 2018-19 campaign saw the team's first season in the Fiserv Forum, leaving the Bradley Center, their home since 1988. The season would end up being the best season of Wojciechowski's tenure at Marquette. Although the team lost Andrew Rowsey, Marquette signed Joey Hauser, the younger brother of Sam. The team finished 24-10 with a 12–6 record in the Big East, placing 2nd in the conference. The team saw a remarkable season for Markus Howard, who averaged 25 PPG. Sam and Joey Hauser played supporting roles, along with Theo John and Sacar Anim. In February, Marquette ranked as high as 10 in the AP poll but lost 5 of their last 9 games of the regular season, including losing dropping 4 straight to close out the regular season. Marquette beat St. John's in the quarterfinals of the 2019 Big East Tournament, but lost to Seton Hall in the semifinals, by a score of 79-81. Marquette was picked as a 5 seed in the 2019 NCAA Tournament, where they matched up against Murray State, led by eventual second overall pick in the 2019 NBA Draft, Ja Morant. Murray State dominated the entire game, upsetting Marquette 83-64.

Despite lofty expectations for the 2019-20 season, the Hauser brothers would transfer out of the program in the offseason, hurting Marquette's chances to make it back to the NCAA tournament. Wojciechowski was able to successfully recruit Symir Torrence and Dexter Akanno, but the whole left by the Hausers was too great. While Markus Howard averaged 27.8 PPG for the season, becoming Marquette's all-time leading scorer in the process, the team finished with an 18-12 overall record, and an 8-10 record in the Big East, their worst Big East record since 2016. The team was slated to play Seton Hall in the 2020 Big East Tournament, the tournament - and the entire season - was halted due to the outbreak of COVID-19.

The 2020-21 season was another disappointment for Marquette. With the departure of Markus Howard, the team struggled, going 13-14 overall, and 8-11 in the Big East. finishing 9th in the Big East. The incoming recruiting class looked promising however, with Dawson Garcia and Justin Lewis making an impact. Garcia stated all 27 games and averaged 13 points and 6.6 rebounds for the season, and Lewis averaging 7.8 points and 5.4 rebounds per game off the bench.

On March 19, 2021, it was announced that Marquette had fired Wojciechowski after seven seasons.

Smart era
On March 26, 2021, Marquette University hired Shaka Smart to replace Wojciechowski as the Golden Eagles head coach.

As Smart assumed control of the program, many players transferred out, including the promising Dawson Garcia, Theo John, Symir Torrence, Jamal Cain, and Koby McEwen. Additionally, D. J. Carton declared for the draft. Smart was able to land four key transfers to aid the team for the 2021-22 season: sophomores Olivier Maxence-Prosper from Clemson and Tyler Kolek from George Mason, along with graduate transfers Darryl Morsell from Maryland and Kur Kuath from Oklahoma. Smart was also able to obtain two four-star recruits from the class of 2021: Emarion Ellis and David Joplin, and three-star Keeyan Itejere, adding to the four-star and three-star that Wojciechowski recruited: Stevie Mitchell and Kam Jones.

Marquette finished the season with a surprising 19-13 record, including an 11-8 record in the Big East, tying for 5th in the conference. The team was ranked as high as 22 before a late-season skid saw the team lose 5 of their last 9 regular season games. They faced Creighton in the 2022 Big East Tournament, but lost 63-74. The team was selected as a 9 seed in the 2022 NCAA Tournament, but lost to 8 seed North Carolina in the round of 64, 63-95.

Marquette was projected to finish 9th in the Big East for the 2022-23 season, but surprised many with their best season in a decade. Despite Justin Lewis declaring for the draft, and Darryl Morsell and Kur Kuath graduating, the team has been ranked since January and is currently 25-6 with a 17-3 conference record. Smart brought in three-stars Sean Jones and Chase Ross, as well as Kiwi prospect Ben Gold. Marquette won the Big East outright for the first time in program history on February 28, 2023.

Postseason results

NCAA tournament
Marquette has appeared in the NCAA tournament 35 times. Their combined record is 41–35. They were National Champions in 1977.

NIT

Marquette has appeared in the National Invitation Tournament 16 times. Their combined record is 23–15. In 1970, Marquette was ranked 8th and received an at-large bid to the NCAA tournament. The NCAA slotted Marquette into the Midwest regional rather than the closer Mideast regional. Al McGuire was so displeased about this that Marquette actually turned down the NCAA bid and chose to instead play in the NIT, which they won. Marquette is the only university to spurn an NCAA tournament invite. The NCAA later instituted a rule which forbade an NCAA Division I men's basketball team from spurning an NCAA bid for an NIT bid. An antitrust case by the NIT ensued over this issue, and the NCAA settled out of court.

NCIT

Marquette appeared in the last National Catholic Invitational Tournament in 1952 and won the NCIT championship.

Coaches

Awards and honors

Coaching

National Coach of the Year
Eddie Hickey (1959)
Al McGuire (1971, 1974)

Great Midwest Conference Coach of the Year
Kevin O'Neill (1993, 1994)

Conference USA Coach of the Year
Tom Crean (2002, 2003)

Big East Conference Men's Basketball Coach of the Year
Shaka Smart (2023)

Individual

National Player of the Year
Butch Lee (1978)

Consensus All-America First Team
Dean Meminger (1971)
Jim Chones (1972)
Butch Lee (1978)
Dwyane Wade (2003)
Markus Howard (2020)

Consensus All-America Second Team
Earl Tatum (1976)
Butch Lee (1977)
Sam Worthen (1980)
Markus Howard (2019)

Great Midwest Conference Player of the Year
Jim McIlvaine (1994)

Conference USA Player of the Year
Dwyane Wade (2003)

Big East Conference Player of the Year
Jae Crowder (2012)
Markus Howard (2019)
Tyler Kolek (2023)

Big East Conference Men's Basketball Sixth Man of the Year Award
Davante Gardner (2013, 2014)
David Joplin (2023)

All-Midwestern Collegiate Conference First Team
Tony Smith (1990)

All-Great Midwest Conference First Team
Ron Curry (1993)
Jim McIlvaine (1994)

All-Conference USA First Team
Brian Wardle (2001)
Dwyane Wade (2002, 2003)
Travis Diener (2004, 2005)

All-Big East Conference First Team
Steve Novak (2006)
Dominic James (2007)
Jerel McNeal (2009)
Jae Crowder (2012)
Darius Johnson-Odom (2012)
Henry Ellenson (2016)
Markus Howard (2019, 2020)
Justin Lewis (2022)
Tyler Kolek (2023)

Retired numbers 

Notes

Hall of Fame inductees

Naismith Memorial Basketball Hall of Fame

Tex Winter (Contributor)
Eddie Hickey (Coach)
Al McGuire (Coach)

National Collegiate Basketball Hall of Fame

Tex Winter (Coach)
Eddie Hickey (Coach)
Al McGuire (Coach)
Rick Majerus (Coach)

All-time career leaders

Lists are accurate through the 2019–20 season.

Points

Rebounds

Assists

Steals

Blocks

Players in the NBA

Current

All-time

Players in international leagues

Niv Berkowitz (born 1986), Israeli basketball player in the Israeli Basketball Premier League
Joseph Chartouny, Lebanese Basketball League
Sandy Cohen (born 1995), American-Israeli basketball player in the Israeli Basketball Premier League
Henry Ellenson, Liga ACB
Jayce Johnson (born 1997), basketball player in the Liga Națională
Markus Howard, Saski Baskonia
 Jamil Wilson (born 1990), basketball player for Hapoel Jerusalem in the Israeli Basketball Premier League

References

External links